Henry Hickman (died 1692) was an English ejected minister and controversialist.

Henry Hickman may also refer to:

Henry Hill Hickman (1800–1830), physician
Henry Hickman Harte (1790–1848), Irish mathematician
Henry Hickman (MP) (died 1618), member of parliament for Northampton, son of Rose Lok

See also
David Henry Hickman (1821–1869), Missouri legislator
Hickman (surname)